Wells is a small mining and tourist town in the Cariboo District of central British Columbia, located on BC Highway 26,  from Quesnel and  before the highway's terminus at Barkerville. It gains much of its revenue and jobs from tourists who pass through on their way to the Bowron Lake Provincial Park and to the historic museum town of Barkerville.

History 
Originally a company town, it was managed by Cariboo Gold Quartz Mine. Fred M. Wells, for whom the town was named, prospected in the area for 10 years before finding the minerals that built the company.  At its heyday of the 1930s, Wells sported 4500 people. In 1942 it had a greater population than Quesnel or Prince George. The closure of the gold and other mineral mines in 1967 took its toll on the town and most of the population moved away. Today it has a listed population of just 250 which doubles during the summer months.

Between May and September, Wells sees over 100,000 tourists pass through on their way to Barkerville.  Most visitors stay or camp overnight in Wells, which has an active arts and outdoor entertainment sector.  During the winter months, visitors come for the cross-country ski trails, snowmobiling, and artistic and study retreats.  During the summer visitors enjoy galleries and live performances.

Climate
Wells has a subarctic climate (Köppen climate classification Dfc), resulting in long, cold and snowy winters, accompanied by short and cool summers due to its high altitude and latitude. Its growing season averages only 66 days. It is located at the mouth of Jack of Clubs Creek, and defined as the source of the Willow River at the outflow of the Jack of Clubs Lake.

Demographics 

See also

List of communities in British Columbia

References

External links 

District municipalities in British Columbia
Ghost towns in British Columbia
Populated places in the Cariboo Regional District
Mining communities in British Columbia